Henry Burrows (25 September 1771 – 11 May 1829) was an English cricketer who played in three first-class cricket matches between 1801 and 1815.

Burrows was born at Monken Hadley in Hertfordshire in 1771. He made his top-class cricket debut in 1801 and went on to play one further match the following season before playing his final first-class match in 1815. He is known to have played in other matches as late as 1821.

Burrows died at Westminster in 1829.

References

1771 births
1829 deaths
English cricketers
English cricketers of 1787 to 1825
Middlesex cricketers
Marylebone Cricket Club cricketers